Kingsborough is a small historic mining town in the locality of Thornborough in the Shire of Mareeba, Queensland, Australia. It was part of the Hodgkinson Minerals Area.

History
Kingston Post Office opened around 1876, was renamed Kingsborough in 1877 and closed in 1924.

A Roman Catholic chapel opened in 1878.

The Town of Kingsborough appears on a 1880 survey plan.

Kingsborough State School opened circa 1882 and closed in 1924.

Heritage listings 
Kingsborough has a number of heritage-listed sites, including:
 General Grant Mine, off Dimbulah-Mount Mulligan Road
 Kingsborough Battery, off Kingsborough-Thornborough Road (former East Street)
 Tyrconnel Mine and Battery, Kingsborough-Thornborough Road

Education 
There are no schools in Kingsborough. The nearest government primary school is Dimbulah State School in Dimbulah to the south; the school also offers secondary schooling to Year 10. For secondary schooling to Year 12, the nearest government secondary school is Mareeba State High School in Mareeba to the south-east, but it is probably too distant for a daily commute, with distance education and boarding school as other options.

References

External links 

 
Towns in Queensland
Shire of Mareeba
Thornborough, Queensland